Cansiglio (Canséi  or Canséjo in Venetian language) is a plateau in the northern-Italian Prealps, included in the provinces of Belluno, Treviso and Pordenone. Cansiglio is home to a very small Language island of Cimbrian.

Geography
It is in fact formed by a basin surrounded by rocky peaks, such as Monte Costa,  the Cima Valsotta, Monte Millifret, Pizzoc and the Monte Cavallo; these mountains separate the Cansiglio from the short Val Lapisina valley and from  Piancavallo.

The plateau features several examples of Karst topography, including several sinkholes and ponors. The main ones are the Bus de la Lum,  Bus della Genziana and Abisso del Col della Rizza, with a deepness of, respectively, -180, -585 and -794 meters.

Most of the territory of Cansiglio is covered by woods, mostly composed of local beeches, although there are also non-autochthonous coniferous trees such as the European spruce. Due to the climatic characteristics of the plateau, the vegetation follows a more inverted distribution than usual: species typical of colder environments occupy the lower altitudes, and those typical of milder ones are at higher altitudes. Anemones grow in large number under the beeches in summer. Large open spaces are used as pastures for sheep and bovines.

History
Pre-historic remains showed that the area was inhabited since as early as the 8th millennium BC. However, the area is mentioned officially for the first time in a 923 document, a diploma by which emperor Berengar I of Italy donated it to the bishop of Belluno. An 1185 papal bull issued by Lucius III called it Campum silium.

In 1404, together with Belluno, it became part of the Republic of Venice. After the latter's collapse and the period of Austrian dominance, it became a statal property under the Kingdom of Italy (late 19th century).

During World War II Cansiglio was the seat of partisan resistance against the German occupation. After a mop-up operation in late August-early September 1944, which ended with a German-Italian victory, the Bus de la Lum was used as an improvised cemetery for casualties from both sides, as well as of local civilians killed by the Germans after the partisans had escaped.

External links

Cansiglio website 
Page at the Veneto region website 
Website about the Cansiglio Cimbrians 

Landforms of Veneto
Landforms of Friuli-Venezia Giulia
Karst
Plateaus of Italy